Hesychotypa fernandezi is a species of beetle in the family Cerambycidae. It was described by Martins and Galileo in 1999. It is known from Colombia.

References

fernandezi
Beetles described in 1999